Robby Gilbert (sometimes credited as Rob Gilbert)  is an American animator,  illustrator, and cartoonist best known for work in educational and interactive media. His work often explores the relationships and interconnectivity of many artistic disciplines. Gilbert has taught animation, illustration, and game design at several colleges is currently a professor of animation at Northern Vermont University in Lyndonville, Vermont.

Gilbert grew up in New York City where he took an early interest in drawing, acting, music, and film. Animation appealed to him as a discipline that involved a synthesis of creative interests and he earned BFA in Media Arts and Animation from the School of Visual Arts. He has worked extensively as an animator for commercial studios, television programming and film. In 1993 he began working with pioneering interactive media companies such as Broderbund Software and Paramount Interactive, where he directed projects that earned several awards including a National Parenting Publications award. In addition, he has  illustrated several children's books. From 1999 to 2009, he illustrated the monthly comic strip “The Adventures of Ranger Rick” for the  National Wildlife Federation's award-winning Ranger Rick Magazine, combining interests in storytelling, drawing, and environmental themes.

Gilbert began teaching animation and game design in Seattle, Washington where he eventually earned a M.Ed. in Education and a MFA in Visual Art from the Vermont College of Fine Arts in Montpelier, Vermont.

Children's books he has illustrated include:

It's Raining, It's Pouring, written by Kin Eagle, 1994. Whispering Coyote Press
Out of the Night, by Lola Schaefer, 1995. Whispering Coyote Press
Hey Diddle, Diddle, by Kin Eagle, 1996. Charlesbridge Publishing
Rub A Dub, Dub, by Kin Eagle, 1997. Charlesbridge Publishing
Humpty Dumpty, by Kin Eagle, 1999. Charlesbridge Publishing.

References

External links
Official website
Ranger Rick interview
Multimedia design and production website
Music website

Living people
American cartoonists
American animators
American children's book illustrators
Artists from New York City
Year of birth missing (living people)